is a Japanese politician of the Liberal Democratic Party, a member of the House of Councillors in the Diet (national legislature). A native of Marugame, Kagawa and graduate of Waseda University, he was elected to the House of Councillors for the first time in 1998 after serving in the assembly of Kagawa Prefecture since 1991.

References

External links 
  in Japanese.

Members of the House of Councillors (Japan)
Waseda University alumni
1946 births
Living people
Liberal Democratic Party (Japan) politicians